The Bahamas has competed at every edition of the Pan American Games since the second edition of the multi-sport event in 1955. Bahamas did not compete at the first and only Pan American Winter Games in 1990.

Medal count 

To sort the tables by host city, total medal count, or any other column, click on the  icon next to the column title.

Summer

Winter

References

See also